Be With You is a 2015 Taiwanese romance, family drama television series produced by Sanlih E-Television, starring Bobby Dou, Huang Pei Jia, Nylon Chen, and Vivi Lee as the main cast. The Chinese title literally translates to "Want To Love". Filming began on March 18, 2015 and will be filmed as it airs. First original broadcast began April 14, 2015 on SETTV channel airing weekly from Monday till Friday at 8:00-9:00 pm.

Synopsis
Can a young woman gather the courage she needs to approach a high school crush? Xia Man Li (Vivi Lee) was always popular in school and was the prettiest girl of her high school, but she has always been unlucky in love. When she attends a high school reunion, she meets up again with Zhao Li Qi (Nylon Chen), a sweet guy that she used to have a crush on. Man Li’s younger sister, Xia Man An (Huang Pei Jia) also has fostered a childhood crush on Zhen Ying Jie (Bobby Dou), but despite all her efforts to get close to him, he always seem to have someone else by his side. A decade later, can the sisters gather the courage to follow their hearts?

Cast

Main cast
 竇智孔 as Zheng Ying Jie 鄭英杰
 黃姵嘉 as Xia Man An 夏曼安
Nylon Chen 陳乃榮 as Zhao Li Qi 趙立奇
 李維維 as Xia Man Li 夏曼儷
 王家梁 as Xia Man Wu 夏曼武
Serena Fang 房思瑜 as Yang Xin Ru 楊心如

Supporting cast
 李宗霖 as Zheng Ying Qian 鄭英謙
 黃薇渟 as Sun Yu Qing 孫妤晴
 楊　晴 as Bai Xuan Xuan 白萱萱
 陳凱旋 as He Shang De 何尚德
 檢　場 as Xia Rong Fa 夏榮發
 潘麗麗 as Zhuang Cui Ping 莊翠萍
 王　道 as Zheng Yong Da 鄭永達
Yang Chieh-mei 楊潔玫 as Liang Qing Zhen 梁琴甄
 王以路 as Lin Yue Er 林樂兒
 蔣孟玲 as Fang Hui Shan 方惠姍
 王滿嬌 as Xia Grandma 夏阿嬤
 何以奇 as Li Xiang Ning 李湘凝
 邱昊奇 as Xiao Bin 蕭 斌

Cameo
Joanne Tseng 曾之喬 as Li Yi Wan 黎一彎
Melvin Sia 謝佳見 as Du Xiao Fei 杜曉飛
 鄧筠庭 as Child Man An
Chen Ding-chung 陳鼎中 as Child Ying Jie
Chan Kai-yu 詹鎧聿 as Child Ying Qian
Huang Jian Hao 黃建豪 as Lu Ke 路克
Xiao Zhi Wei 蕭志偉 as Lu Ren Jia 路人甲 
 樓學賢 as Professor Chen
 陳語安 as Ms. Chen (Professor Chen's daughter)
 林埈永 as thief
Shao Yu-chieh 邵郁傑 as store manager
 周明增 as Taoist priest
 沈孟生 as Tsai Liang Ming 蔡亮銘
Lin Chia-wei 林家磑 as Secretary Liu

Soundtrack
Finding You Is My Greatest Accomplishment 找到你是我最偉大的成功 by Leo Ku 古巨基
Take Care of Her For Me 替我照顧她 by Hu Xia 胡夏
Happiness is Here 幸福在這裡 by Hu Xia 胡夏
Undertake 承擔 by Leo Ku 古巨基
Why Bother? 何必打擾 by Leo Ku 古巨基
Fearless 無畏 by Leo Ku 古巨基
Monster 怪物 by Leo Ku 古巨基
Music Shutter 音樂快門 by Eric Chou 周興哲
Oh! Love OH!愛 by Nylon Chen 陳乃榮
Fearlessly 一無所懼 by Ailing Tai 戴愛玲
You are Not Mine 你不是我 by Ailing Tai 戴愛玲
The Most Precious Moment 最幸福的時間 by Victor Wong 品冠

Broadcast

Episode ratings

Awards and nominations

References

External links
Be With You SETTV Official website 
Be With You ETTV Website 
Be With You Official Facebook page 

Eastern Television original programming
2015 Taiwanese television series debuts
2015 Taiwanese television series endings
Sanlih E-Television original programming
Taiwanese romance television series